Olav Andresen (15 April 1877 – 27 June 1950) was a Norwegian politician.

He was born in Heddal to Andres Johannessen and Ragnhild Amundsdatter. He served as mayor of Notodden 1922–1924, 1928–1931 and 1934–1940. He was elected representative to the Storting for the period 1925–1927, for the Labour Party.

References

1877 births
People from Notodden
Labour Party (Norway) politicians
Members of the Storting
Mayors of places in Telemark
1950 deaths